Humber River—Black Creek is a provincial electoral district in Ontario, Canada, that has been represented in the Legislative Assembly of Ontario since 1999. Prior to the 2018 election, the riding was known as York West.

Its population was 110,384 in 2001. The district includes the northwest corner of the former city of North York, including the extreme western part of the Downsview neighbourhood.

It consists of the part of the City of Toronto bounded on the north by the northern city limit, and on the east, south and west by a line drawn from the city limit south along Keele Street, west along Grandravine Drive, southeast along Black Creek, west along Sheppard Avenue West, south along Jane Street, west along Highway 401, and northwest along the Humber River to the northern city limit.

The riding is represented by Tom Rakocevic in the Legislative Assembly of Ontario.

History
The riding was founded at the time of Confederation in 1867. It consisted of the area of York Township west of the Humber River, an area now known as Etobicoke. This riding lasted unchanged until 1963 when the area was split into four ridings, York West, Etobicoke, Lakeshore and Humber. The riding was reduced to an area south of Richview Road (later Eglinton Avenue West) and north of Bloor Street West. The boundaries changed again in 1975, with Kipling Avenue becoming its eastern boundary and Highway 401 the northern boundary, while the eastern portion of the riding became part of the new Etobicoke-Humber riding. The riding was dissolved in 1987, with parts of it joining the ridings of Etobicoke West and Etobicoke—Humber.

The riding was reestablished in 1999 when provincial ridings were defined to have the same borders as federal ridings. It consists of parts of the old North York ridings of Yorkview and Downsview.

Members of Provincial Parliament

Election results

2007 electoral reform referendum

References

Notes

Citations

External links
Elections Ontario Past Election Results
Map of riding for 2018 election

Ontario provincial electoral districts
Provincial electoral districts of Toronto